The SuperLoop was a bus rapid transit system in San Diego, California, United States, in the University City area. It connected the University of California San Diego to Westfield UTC.

The first phase of station construction began in late 2007. SuperLoop began operations in an interim phase in mid-2009. At the launch of SuperLoop service, vehicles ran approximately every 10 minutes during the peak periods, and every 15 minutes during non-peak periods. Adjustments were made after periodic review to better serve demand. In June 2012, the SuperLoop was extended to serve the area east of UTC.

The system featured a number of amenities associated with bus rapid transit, such as signal prioritization, electronic signs in shelters indicating time until the arrival of the next bus, and recognizable branding.  However, it featured only a small quantity of dedicated lanes.

Traffic pattern studies show that 60% of vehicles traveling in University City make internal trips. The SuperLoop is expected to reduce the number of vehicles on the road by absorbing the traffic created by internal travelers. The 8-mile loop featured 15 stops served by as many as 12 dedicated New Flyer hybrid buses.

Service of SuperLoop was provided directly by the San Diego Metropolitan Transit System. In 2015, SuperLoop was added to the San Diego Rapid bus transit network. The fleet of 60-foot New Flyer Industries Xcelsior buses were also introduced to the routes. Today, the routes are part of the Rapid network, with UTC transit center becoming a hub for the combined network. This ended the physical usage of the SuperLoop brand name after six years.

Fares
SuperLoop followed the same fare policy as all other non-express MTS bus routes.

Scheduling

Monday Through Friday

Weekends And Holidays

See also
 Metropolitan Transit System
 List of bus routes in San Diego
 MTS Rapid: On September 6, 2015, SuperLoop routes became Rapid services.

Related Links 
 SANDAG: SuperLoop
 SuperLoop Homepage

References

Bus transportation in California
Bus rapid transit in California
Public transportation in San Diego County, California
Transportation in San Diego
2008 establishments in California
2015 disestablishments in California